Gilbert Kalish (born July 2, 1935) is an American pianist.

He was born in New York and studied with Leonard Shure, Julius Hereford and Isabelle Vengerova.  He was a founding member of the Contemporary Chamber Ensemble, a pioneering new music group that flourished during the 1960s and '70s.  He was a pianist of the Boston Symphony Chamber Players from 1969 to 1998.

He is noted for his partnerships with other artists, particularly his thirty-year collaboration with mezzo-soprano Jan DeGaetani, but also including cellists Timothy Eddy and Joel Krosnick, and soprano Dawn Upshaw.

Kalish is Leading Professor and Head of Performance Activities at the State University of New York at Stony Brook. From 1968 to 1997, he was a faculty member of the Tanglewood Music Center and served as the "Chairman of the Faculty" at Tanglewood from 1985 to 1997. He has also served on the faculties of the Banff Centre and the Steans Institute at Ravinia, and is renowned for his master class presentations.

Kalish has a large discography, encompassing classical repertory, 20th-century masterworks and new compositions.  These include his solo recordings of Charles Ives' Concord Sonata and sonatas of Joseph Haydn, vocal music with Jan DeGaetani and landmarks of the 20th century by composers such as Elliott Carter, George Crumb, Ralph Shapey and Arnold Schoenberg. He made the world premiere recordings of Charles Ives' Largo for Violin and Piano, In Re Con Moto et al., Largo Risoluto No. 1 & 2, A Set of Three Short Pieces, and songs The All-Enduring, The Innate, and Song (She is not fair). Kalish appeared on Charles Schwartz's 1979 jazz symphony Mother__! Mother__!! with Clark Terry and Zoot Sims.

Kalish has given many first performances, and has had many works written for him.  He gave the first solo piano recital in the newly renovated Miller Theatre at Columbia University.  He has received many honours, including three Grammy Award nominations.  In 1995, he was presented with the Paul Fromm Award by the University of Chicago Music Department for distinguished service to the music of our time.

Notes

References
Stony Brook: Gilbert Kalish
Gilbert Kalish interview, July 15, 1999

American classical pianists
American male classical pianists
Jewish classical pianists
Arabesque Records artists
Living people
1935 births
Musicians from New York City
Stony Brook University faculty
20th-century American pianists
Classical musicians from New York (state)
21st-century classical pianists
20th-century American male musicians
21st-century American male musicians
21st-century American pianists